The World War II Soviet submarine L-4 belonged to the L class or  of minelayer submarines. She had been named Garibaldets in honour of the men of Garibaldi. During the war she was commanded by Evgeniy Petrovich Polyakov.

Service history 
For her service, the submarine was awarded the Order of the Red Banner. Among her victories was the torpedoing of the German tanker Friederike (formerly Firuz), whose loss prevented her use during the Axis evacuation of Crimea during the Crimean Offensive.

In 1944 Michman  Ivan Perov was awarded Hero of the Soviet Union.

Mines from L-4 also damaged the German barge F-130. During an artillery duel she damaged the German barge F-329.

References 

1931 ships
Ships built in the Soviet Union
Leninets-class submarines
World War II submarines of the Soviet Union